Leonardo "Léo" Henrique Veloso (born May 29, 1987) is a Brazilian professional footballer who plays as a left back.

Career
Veloso was born in Pedro Leopoldo. During his youth, he played for Atlético Mineiro in Belo Horizonte. His prosperous background gave him quite a wealthy youth. After playing a few years in the Atlético Mineiro reserve squad, he moved to the Netherlands with his wife Bruna Cypriano Veloso in January 2008. He signed a two and a half year contract with Willem II Tilburg. For the first half a year, he did not play for the senior squad because he had adaptation problems. He made his professional debut on August 30, 2008 in a 2–1 home win against Ajax.

In February 2010, he signed with Romanian side CFR Cluj. In January 2012, he joined Ukrainian side Chornomorets.

Honours

Player
CFR Cluj
Liga I: 2009–10
Romanian Cup: 2009–10

References

External links
Profile at the Brazilian Football Confederation's page 
 
 

1987 births
Living people
Association football fullbacks
Brazilian footballers
Willem II (football club) players
CFR Cluj players
FC Chornomorets Odesa players
Goiás Esporte Clube players
Eredivisie players
Liga I players
Ukrainian Premier League players
Expatriate footballers in the Netherlands
Expatriate footballers in Romania
Expatriate footballers in Ukraine
Brazilian expatriate sportspeople in Ukraine